The Terter or Terteroba (Bulgarian and ) was a Cuman–Kipchak tribe or clan that took refuge in Hungary and then Bulgaria in the mid-13th century and may have produced the Terter dynasty that eventually ruled Bulgaria.

According to Peter Golden, Terter is derived from a tributary of the Kura River in the Southern Caucasus. In the Russian annals, they were known as Ter'trobiči.  In Arabic, they may have been called Durut.

It has been claimed that khan Köten ( 1223–39) belonged to the Terter. During the Mongol invasion, the surviving Cuman–Kipchak tribes sought refuge in the Kingdom of Hungary (1238). These adopted Christianity in return for protection. According to Hungarian sources, these tribes included the Chertan, Ulasoba, Burcoba (Burčeviči), Kolaba (Kolabiči) and Terteroba, the latter which was Köten's family.

According to Plamen Pavlov the Terter dynasty was a branch of the Terteroba who had settled in Bulgaria as part of the second wave of Cuman migration, coming from the Kingdom of Hungary after 1241.

References

Cumans
Turkic peoples of Europe
13th century in Bulgaria
13th century in Hungary